Gustav Püttjer (15 May 1886 – 11 August 1959) was a German film actor who appeared in around 150 feature films between 1927 and 1959. He largely played character parts. After the Second World War he settled in East Germany appearing in the films of the state-controlled company DEFA.

Selected filmography
 The Fourth from the Right (1929)
 The Last Company (1930)
 Road to Rio (1931)
 A Woman Branded (1931)
 The Street Song (1931)
 F.P.1 (1932)
 Five from the Jazz Band (1932)
 Haunted People (1932)
 All is at Stake (1932)
 Here's Berlin (1932)
 A Bit of Love (1932)
 The Importance of Being Earnest (1932)
 Scandal on Park Street (1932)
 Things Are Getting Better Already (1932)
 Dreaming Lips (1932)
 The House of Dora Green (1933)
 Life Begins Tomorrow (1933)
 Two Good Comrades (1933)
 Girls of Today (1933)
 Black Fighter Johanna (1934)
 Police Report (1934)
 The Girlfriend of a Big Man (1934)
 Decoy (1934)
 The Voice of Love (1934)
 The Four Musketeers (1934)
 Artisten (1935)
 Variety (1935)
 Pillars of Society (1935)
 Moscow-Shanghai (1936)
 Ninety Minute Stopover (1936)
 Under Blazing Heavens (1936)
 Fridericus (1937)
 Men Without a Fatherland (1937)
 Strong Hearts in the Storm (1937)
 Seven Slaps (1937)
 Comrades at Sea (1938)
 Monika (1938)
 The Woman at the Crossroads (1938)
 One Night in May (1938)
 Red Orchids (1938)
 Freight from Baltimore (1938)
 The Great and the Little Love (1938)
 Women for Golden Hill (1938)
 Aufruhr in Damaskus (1939)
 Men Are That Way (1939)
 The Fox of Glenarvon (1940)
 Diesel (1942)
 Back Then (1943)
 Melody of a Great City (1943)
 The Woman of My Dreams (1944)
 Chemistry and Love (1948)
 Quartet of Five (1949)
 The Great Mandarin (1949)
 Bürgermeister Anna (1950)
 Five Suspects (1950)
 Der Kahn der fröhlichen Leute (1950)
 The Call of the Sea (1951)
 The Last Year (1951)
 Stärker als die Nacht (1954)
 Old Barge, Young Love (1957)
 SAS 181 Does Not Reply (1959)

Bibliography
 Shandley, Robert. Rubble Films: German Cinema in the Shadow of the Third Reich. Temple University Press, 2001.
 Youngkin, Stephen D. The Lost One: A Life of Peter Lorre. University Press of Kentucky, 2005.

External links

1886 births
1959 deaths
German male film actors
German male silent film actors
Male actors from Hamburg
East German actors
20th-century German male actors